Sanor Longsawang (Thai เสนาะ โล่งสว่าง) is a Thai retired football player. He is a midfielder who scored 4 goals for the Thailand national team and appeared in three 1998 FIFA World Cup qualifying matches. In 2012, he played for Paknampho NSRU in Thai Division 2 League.

Honours
Thai Farmers Bank
Asian Club Championship: 1993–94, 1994–95
Kor Royal Cup: 1993, 1995, 1999
Queen's Cup: 1994, 1995, 1996, 1997
Afro-Asian Club Championship: 1994
Thailand FA Cup: 1999

Chainat Hornbill
Regional League Division 2 Northern Region: 2010

References

 The Independent
 SADEC website

External links

1971 births
Living people
Sanor Longsawang
Sanor Longsawang
1996 AFC Asian Cup players
Sanor Longsawang
Southeast Asian Games medalists in football
Association football midfielders
Competitors at the 1993 Southeast Asian Games
Competitors at the 1995 Southeast Asian Games
Competitors at the 1997 Southeast Asian Games
Competitors at the 1999 Southeast Asian Games
Sanor Longsawang
Sanor Longsawang
Sanor Longsawang
Footballers at the 1998 Asian Games
Sanor Longsawang
Sanor Longsawang